Benjamin Gerritszoon Cuyp (or Cuijp; December 1612 – 28 August 1652) was a Dutch Golden Age landscape painter.

Biography
Cuyp was born and died in Dordrecht, in the Dutch Republic. According to Arnold Houbraken, he was a pupil of his uncle (Jacob Gerritsz Cuyp) who taught him together with his son, (Benjamin's cousin) Aelbert Cuyp. Houbraken felt Aelbert had neater brush strokes and Benjamin showed the rough approach of his teacher.

However according to the Rijksbureau voor Kunsthistorische Documentatie (RKD), Houbraken was mistaken about the family; where in actuality Benjamin and Jacob were both born in Dordrecht as the sons of a glasspainter from Venlo named Gerrit Gerritsz Cuyp. Benjamin learned to paint from his older half-brother, Jacob Cuyp. He was therefore the uncle, not the cousin, of the much more famous Aelbert Cuyp. He is known for allegorical pieces, genre works, beach scenes, military scenes, and landscapes. He influenced Barent van Kalraet, and was followed by Maerten Fransz van der Hulst. While his Baroque painting styles seems to have been influenced by Rembrandt’s dramatic use of chiaroscuro.

Works 
 Joseph interpreting the dreams of the baker and the butler, Rijksmuseum, Amsterdam
 The Entombment, Rijksmuseum, Amsterdam
 Interior of a peasant cottage, Rijksmuseum, Amsterdam
 Saul and the Witch of Endor evoking the ghost of Samuel, Charles de Bruyeres Museum, Remiremont, France

Gallery

References

External links 

 Others works available in his page in the Wikimedia Commons

Benjamin Gerritsz Cuyp on Artnet
Benjamin Cuyp at PubHist

1612 births
1652 deaths
Dutch Golden Age painters
Dutch male painters
Artists from Dordrecht